Jelte D Schoonheim (born 16 November 1981) is a Dutch cricketer. A right-handed batsman, he made his debut for the Dutch cricket team in an Intercontinental Cup game in 2007, where he made scores of 15 and 2 and also bowled a wicketless spell. Although he did not appear for the team for another year, he returned for the Netherlands' second Twenty20 International, although he did not bat or bowl in the match.

External links

1981 births
Living people
Sportspeople from Rotterdam
Dutch cricketers
Netherlands Twenty20 International cricketers